CFUR-FM is a Canadian FM radio station, broadcasting at FM 88.7 in Prince George, British Columbia. It is a campus radio station based at the University of Northern British Columbia. The station is known to locals as "FUR", and is governed by the CFUR Radio Society, a non-profit corporation consisting on of students and other community members who promote CFUR via membership drives, fundraisers, and on-air broadcasting.

Mission statement
CFUR's stated mission is to support the cultural, artistic, and political evolution of northern British Columbia by providing space to share and discover new music and ideas, searching for local talent, and focusing on inclusivity and diversity.

History

The station was originally licensed by the Canadian Radio-television and Telecommunications Commission on 12 September 2001. The station is a developmental campus/community station, and is a licence process created by the CRTC to encourage and streamline the creation of campus and community radio stations. The station was subsequently granted a full Class A license in 2007.

Blackfoot's "Highway Song" was the first song broadcast on 12 September 2001.

CFUR-FM is a member of the National Campus and Community Radio Association and the Community Radio Fund of Canada.

References

External links
 CFUR-FM
 
 

Fur
University of Northern British Columbia
Fur
Radio stations established in 2001
2001 establishments in British Columbia